Jean-Baptiste Auguste Clésinger (22 October 1814 – 5 January 1883) was a 19th-century French sculptor and painter.

Life 

Auguste Clésinger was born in Besançon, in the Doubs department of France. His father, Georges-Philippe, was a sculptor and trained Auguste in art. Auguste first exhibited at the Paris Salon in 1843 with a bust of vicomte Jules de Valdahon and last exhibited there in 1864. At the 1847 Salon, he created a sensation with his Woman Bitten by a Serpent, produced from life-casts from his model Apollonie Sabatier (the pose being particularly suitable for such a method), thus reinforcing the scandal with an erotic dimension. Appolonie Sabatier was a salonnière and the mistress of Charles Baudelaire and others. The sculpture's beauty was praised by Théophile Gautier:

Clésinger also portrayed Sabatier as herself, in an 1847 marble sculpture now in the Musée d'Orsay.

He produced busts of Rachel Félix and of Théophile Gautier, and a statue of Louise of Savoy (now in the Jardin du Luxembourg). He received the knight's cross of the Légion d'honneur in 1849 and rose to an officer of the order in 1864. In 1847, he married George Sand's daughter, Solange Dudevant. In 1849, the couple had a daughter, Jeanne, nicknamed Nini, who died in 1855 shortly after her parents' separation.

At the death of the composer-pianist Frédéric Chopin on 17 October 1849, Clésinger made Chopin's death mask and a cast of his hands. He also sculpted, in 1850, the white marble funerary monument of Euterpe, the muse of music, for Chopin's grave at the Père Lachaise Cemetery, in Paris.

Clésinger died in Paris on 5 January 1883. He is buried in the Père Lachaise Cemetery (division 10).  His heir was his model and mistress Berthe de Courrière.

Selected works 
 1847 : Woman Bitten by a Serpent, marble, Musée d'Orsay
 1848 : Bacchante, a variation after the Woman bitten by a serpent, marble, Musée du Petit-Palais
 1847 : Louise of Savoy, stone statue, Jardin du Luxembourg
 1857 : Battle of the Roman bulls, painted plaster, Musée des Beaux-Arts de Besançon
 1857 : The infant Hercules strangling the serpents of Envy, bronze, Musée d'Orsay
 1869 : Nereid groupe en marbre, Musée des Beaux-Arts et d'archéologie de Besançon
 1854 : Sappho, plaster, Musée municipal de Châlons-en-Champagne
 1865 : Femme à la rose, bronze, Musée d'Orsay

Biblical art 
He produced life-size statues for the side chapels of the Église de la Madeleine in Besançon, of the Via Dolorosa, the Pietà, the Entombment, the Resurrection and ascension.

Notes and references

External links 
 Biographies of Auguste Clésinger
 Musée de la Vie romantique, Hôtel Scheffer-Renan, Paris
 Les amis de George Sand
 

1814 births
1883 deaths
19th-century French painters
French male painters
Burials at Père Lachaise Cemetery
Artists from Besançon
Officiers of the Légion d'honneur
19th-century French sculptors
French male sculptors
19th-century French male artists